Livio Tesconi (15 September 1935 – 18 March 2004) was an Italian rower. He competed in the men's eight event at the 1956 Summer Olympics.

References

External links
 

1935 births
2004 deaths
Italian male rowers
Olympic rowers of Italy
Rowers at the 1956 Summer Olympics